is a Japanese manga artist born in Adachi, Tokyo, Japan, most famous for his manga Hellsing and Drifters.

Career

Hirano said he learned how to be a manga artist from reading Akira Toriyama and Akira Sakuma's Hetappi Manga Kenkyūjo. Starting his career first as a manga artist's assistant (self-described as "horrible" and "lazy" in said assistant position), and later a hentai manga artist, he went on to enjoy somewhat limited success with other relatively unknown manga titles such as Angel Dust, Coyote, Gun Mania and Hi-Tension. His first major success came with his manga series Hellsing, which got its start and was subsequently serialized in a monthly manga magazine, Young King OURs, towards the latter half of 1997.

However, Hellsing was not the earliest Hirano series to be published in Young King OURs monthly. In 1996, the same year Hellsing'''s precursor, The Legends of Vampire Hunter, was first released as a single H short story in Heavenly Pleasure (a monthly H-centric manga magazine), another World War II-based short story named Hi-And-Low was being published in Young King OURs by a then lesser-known Kouta Hirano. The story takes place primarily at a train station in Russia and features two female characters that are strikingly similar to Integra Helsing from Hellsing and Yumiko/Yumie in Crossfire; and who are, in actuality, undercover Axis spies in-league with one another for a common purpose: the success of Operation Barbarossa. This story saw ink in one issue of OURs before being discontinued in favor of Hellsing itself.

A number of Hirano's older works are now considered collector's items due to the small number of them that exist. Many characters from Hellsing appear in his previous works and, as mentioned above, there is a rare hentai prototype of Hellsing titled The Legends of (the) Vampire Hunter. At Otakon 2006, he said in an interview that in about a year and a half to two years, he will finish Hellsing and move on to a different project which he says will be kept a secret until the time comes. This statement was proven true when Hellsing ended with 95 chapters in October 2008. Hirano has since begun a new series, Drifters, which was published in April 30's issue of YKO and which Hirano keeps working on to this day.

Hirano has also been part of a doujinshi circle titled GUY-YA, consisting of himself and Read or Die manga artist Shutaro Yamada.

Works

Alphabetical list of worksAngel DustAssassin ColosseumBe Wild!!Bishōnen de Meitantei de DoesuCount Pierre Eros' Gorgeous Daily GrindCoyoteCrossfireDaidōjin MonogatariDeepDesert SchutzstaffelDriftersDoc's storyFrontGun ManiaHellsingHellsing: The DawnHi-TensionHi-and-LowIkaryakuIkasu Sōtō Tengokukarera no ShūmatsuKoi no StrikebackMahō no Muteki Kyōshi Kawaharā ZMagic SchoolSusume! IkaryakuSusume!! Seigaku Dennō KenkyūbuThe Legends of Vampire HunterThe WeekendersUFO 2000''

References

External links

Official Geneon Entertainment Hellsing website

1973 births
Hentai creators
Living people
People from Adachi, Tokyo
Manga artists from Tokyo